The 2013 Cavan Intermediate Football Championship was the 49th edition of Cavan GAA's premier Gaelic football tournament for intermediate graded clubs in County Cavan, Ireland. The tournament consists of 14 teams, with the winner representing Cavan in the Ulster Intermediate Club Football Championship.

Killeshandra won the championship after a 1-10 to 1-8 win over Shercock in the final.

Team Changes
The following teams have changed division since the 2013 championship season.

To Championship
Promoted from 2012 Cavan Junior Football Championship
  Laragh United - (Junior Champions)
  Mountnugent

From Championship
Promoted to 2013 Cavan Senior Football Championship
  Lacken - (Intermediate Champions)
  Crosserlough
Relegated to 2013 Cavan Junior Football Championship
  Knockbride
  Kill Shamrocks

Opening rounds

Preliminary round

Round 1

Back-door stage

Round 2

Round 3

Knock-out stage

Quarter-finals

Semi-finals

Final

Relegation play-offs

Semi-final

Final

References

External links
 Cavan at ClubGAA
 Official Cavan GAA Website

Cavan Intermediate Football Championship
Cavan GAA Football championships